Devall (also DeValle) is a surname of French ties. Variant spellings include: Davolls, Deavall, DeVile, Devill, Deville, Divall, Divell and Evill. Its meaning is derived from French the town of Deville, Ardennes.

In France, the surname is derived from 'de Val' meaning 'of the valley.'  Variant spellings include: Lavalle, Lavallie, Laval, Lavall, Deval, Duval, Lavell, Lavelle and Lavielle.  The Devall surname has also been spelled some other ways including Devoll, DeVol, Duvall, DeValle and Devaulle.

Notable people with the surname include:

 Danny DeVall (b. 1972), Football player
 Dave Devall (b. 1931), Canadian weather reporter.
 Denzel Devall (b. 1994), American football player
 Trevor Devall (b. 1972), Canadian voice actor

See also
 Deval (disambiguation)
 Devall (disambiguation)
 Duval (surname)
 Duvall (surname)
 Laval (surname)

References

English-language surnames
French-language surnames